Adenylate kinase 3 is a protein that in humans is encoded by the AK3 gene.

Function

The protein encoded by this gene is a GTP:ATP phosphotransferase that is found in the mitochondrial matrix. Several transcript variants encoding a few different isoforms have been found for this gene.

References

External links 
 PDBe-KB provides an overview of all the structure information available in the PDB for Human GTP:AMP phosphotransferase AK3, mitochondrial  (AK3)

Further reading 

Genes on human chromosome 9